The Kharaba Bridge is a Roman bridge in the village of Kharaba in the fertile Hauran region of Syria, close to the city of Bosra (ancient Bostra).

The bridge crosses the Wadi Zeidi, a tributary of the Yarmuk, 3.5 km northwest of Bosra. It has three semi-circular arches, each 3.8 m clear, that rest on 2.4 m wide piers with a height of 2.5 m to the springing level. The bridge width is 4.52 m. At the eastern side exists a small squarish floodway which is supported by a column with capital. The vaults and the covering are predominantly built with black greenish basalt ashlar; overall, the ancient structure is still in a fairly good condition.

There are at least two more Roman bridges crossing the Wadi Zeidi: the Gemarrin Bridge and one at At-Tayyibeh.

See also 
 List of Roman bridges
 Roman architecture
 Roman engineering

References

Sources 
 
 

Roman bridges in Syria
Deck arch bridges
Stone bridges in Syria
Buildings and structures in Daraa Governorate